The 79th Air Assault Brigade is a formation of the Ukrainian Air Assault Forces. The paratrooper brigade is based in Mykolaiv.

Soldiers from the Brigade have served as peacekeepers in Yugoslavia, Iraq, Kosovo, and Sierra Leone.

In 2014, the Brigade took part in suppressing the 2014 insurgency in Donbas during the 2014 pro-Russian conflict in Ukraine. The brigade fought in the Second Battle of Donetsk Airport, where it and other Ukrainian military units became known as the "Cyborgs" due to their stubborn defense of the Donetsk Airport.

History

The Brigade's history began as 40th Air Assault Brigade in the fall of 1979, formed from elements of the 97th Guards Airborne Regiment of the 7th Guards Airborne Division. Later it was reorganized into the 40th Airborne Brigade between 6 December 1989 and 1 August 1990 (1 June 1990 according to Holm). That redesignation marked the transfer of the brigade from the Odessa Military District to the Soviet Airborne Troops. In September 1993 the Brigade was renamed 40th Separate Airmobile Brigade.

The 40th Brigade was reorganized and reduced into the 79th Airmobile Regiment.

On July 1, 2007, the Brigade was formed by combining the 79th Airmobile Regiment with 11th Army Aviation Regiment.

In 2014, the Brigade took part in the fighting of the 2014 insurgency in Donbas during the 2014 pro-Russian conflict in Ukraine. 54 persons called up for mobilization (and thus serving in the Brigade) deserted.

Crimean crisis and war in Donbas
Pro-Russian protesters blocked the unit's base in Voznesensk on 1 March 2014 and a platoon of soldiers was sent to reinforce and secure the military equipment located at the facility from looting. The protest was resolved without violent clashes. Other than Spetsnaz forces of Ukraine, the unit was one of the first to be mobilized during the Crimean Crisis and the war in Donbas by being deployed to the Crimean-Kherson border in order to prevent Russian forces from a possible advance into mainland Kherson Oblast on 13 March 2014. On March 26 Ukrainian forces secured the Russian Mars-75 naval navigation station located in Kherson Oblast.

The unit was deployed to Donbas in May 2014 and fought in the Battle in Shakhtarsk Raion where it held the objective of securing both the Russian border and the strategic Savur-Mohyla hill. The unit, along with the 72nd Mechanized Brigade became trapped in southern Luhansk oblast as pro-Russian forces cut their supply lines from the bulk of Ukrainian force in July. Ukrainian forces attempted to keep the units resupplied delivering 15 tons of supplies through enemy lines to the unit. The 79th Airmobile Brigade was able to break through enemy lines on 7 August 2014 along with much of their equipment, however it was reported that the unit was severely short on ammunition and would likely not be able to continue holding its positions if it did not break through the encirclement. Due to spending a month surrounded by enemy forces the unit was sent back to its home station in order to regroup.

The unit was redeployed after a month of R/R to hold the southern Donetsk Oblast in the Mariupol and Donetsk regions. In September the unit joined the 3rd Separate Spetsnaz Regiment along with National Guard units in the defense of Donetsk Airport. Due to their stubborn resistance during the defense of Donetsk Airport they were referred to as Cyborgs.

In 2016, after brigade received a company of T-80 tanks, the 79th Airmobile Brigade became 79th Air Assault Brigade.

Russian invasion of Ukraine
The brigade took part in the Battle of Mykolaiv, Battle of Lyman, Battle of Sviatohirsk.

On 18 March 2022, the brigade's base in Mykolaiv was struck by Russian cruise missiles. Dozens of Ukrainian servicemen died in the bombing.

Structure

Until summer of 2007 the formation was a regiment. In 2008 the brigade was being manned by contract soldiers.

Until 2007
1st Battalion
2nd Battalion

Current Structure 
As of 2017 the brigade's structure is as follows:

 79th Air Assault Brigade, Mykolaiv
 Headquarters & Headquarters Company
 1st Air Assault Battalion
 2nd Air Assault Battalion
 3rd Air Assault Battalion
 Brigade Artillery Group
 Headquarters & Target Acquisition Battery
 Self-propelled Artillery Battalion (2S1 Gvozdika)
 Howitzer Artillery Battalion (2A18 D-30)
 Rocket Artillery Battalion (BM-21 Grad)
 Anti-Aircraft Missile Artillery Battalion
 Tank Company
 Reconnaissance Company
 Engineer Company
 Landing Support Company
 Maintenance Company
 Logistic Company
 Signal Company
 CBRN-defense Company
 Medical Company
 Sniper Platoon

Past Commanders
Lieutenant Colonel Atroshchenko — December 1992
Zeleniak — 1992—1996
Colonel Kostiantyn Maslenikov — 2002–2005; 2007—2011
Colonel Oleksiy Shandar — 2012—2016

References

Sources 
 
 Unofficial website of VDV
40th independent Landing-Assault Brigade - 40th Independent Landing-Assault Brigade
UNIAN: News of Ukraine this year - the last days in Ukraine

Brigades of the Ukrainian Air Assault Forces
Airmobile brigades
Military units and formations established in 1979